Events from the year 1621 in art.

Events
Dutch painter Johannes van der Beeck is jailed for failing to pay alimony to his former wife Neeltgen van Camp.

Paintings

 Giovanni Francesco Barbieri – The Suicide of Cleopatra
 Marcus Gheeraerts the Younger – Susanna Temple
 Guercino
Aurora (fresco, Casino di Villa Boncompagni Ludovisi, Rome)
Christ and the Woman Taken in Adultery (approximate date)
 Giovanni Francesco Guerrieri – Virgin and Child
 Jacob Jordaens – The Family of the Artist (1621-2)
 Dirck van Baburen – Youth Playing a Small Whistle
 Domenico Zampieri – The Assumption of Mary Magdalene into Heaven

Births
May 25 – David Beck, Dutch portrait painter (died 1656)
June
Allaert van Everdingen, Dutch painter and printmaker in etching and mezzotint (died 1675)
Isaac van Ostade, Dutch genre and landscape painter (died 1649)
August 19 – Gerbrand van den Eeckhout, painter of the Dutch Golden Age (died 1674)
date unknown
Giacinto Brandi, Italian painter, active mainly in Rome and Naples (died 1691)
Fabrizio Chiari, painter and engraver (died 1695)
Jacques Courtois, French painter (died 1676)
Giuseppe Diamantini, Italian painter and printmaker of the Baroque period (died 1705)
Albrecht Kauw, Swiss still-life painter, cartographer and a painter of vedute (died 1681)
Matthew Snelling, English miniature painter (died 1678)
Robert Streater, English landscape, history, still-life and portrait artist, architectural painter, and etcher (died 1679)
Hendrick van Balen the Younger, Flemish painter (died 1663)
Jan Baptist Weenix, painter of the Dutch Golden Age (died 1660)
probable – Giulio Cesare Milani, Italian painter (died 1678)

Deaths
April 1 – Cristofano Allori, Italian painter (born 1577)
May 15 – Hendrick de Keyser, Dutch sculptor and architect (born 1565)
date unknown
Cornelis Boel, Flemish draughtsman and engraver (born 1576)
Louis de Caullery, French painter (born 1555)
Ambrosius Bosschaert, Dutch painter (born 1573)
Marzio di Colantonio, Italian painter of still lifes and landscapes, and fresco decorations (born 1560)
Dirk Pietersz, Dutch Golden Age painter (born 1558)
Terenzio Terenzi, Italian painter (born 1575)
Giovanni Vasanzio, Dutch-born architect, garden designer and engraver (born 1550)

References

 
Years of the 17th century in art
1620s in art